Staatsbibliothek is the German word for "State (in the context of government) Library". It may refer to:

 Staatsbibliothek, the general concept
 Staatsbibliothek Bamberg, a library in Bavaria
 Staatsbibliothek zu Berlin, the Berlin State Library
 State libraries of Germany, the list of all Germany Staatsbibliotheks